Mike Houghton is a former guard in the National Football League (NFL).

Biography
Houghton was born Michael Christopher Houghton on December 1, 1979 in Northridge, California. He is now a teacher in Menifee, California as a PE and history teacher.

Career
Houghton was drafted by the Green Bay Packers in the sixth round of the 2002 NFL Draft and would be a member of the Buffalo Bills that season. He played at the collegiate level at San Diego State University.

See also
List of Buffalo Bills players

References

People from Northridge, Los Angeles
Buffalo Bills players
American football offensive guards
San Diego State Aztecs football players
1979 births
Living people